Afewerki Berhane (born 6 May 1996) is an Eritrean long distance runner.

In age-specific competitions, he finished fourth in the 10,000 metres at the 2014 World Junior Championships and thirteenth (and won a team bronze medal) in the junior race at the 2015 World Cross Country Championships.

He finished sixth in the 10,000 metres at the 2015 African Games, 19th (and 4th team-wise) at the 2017 World Cross Country Championships and 19th at the 2018 IAAF World Half Marathon Championships.

His personal best times are 13:28.39 minutes in the 5000 metres, achieved in May 2016 in Carquefou; 28:04.07 minutes in the 10,000 metres, achieved in July 2015 in San Sebastián; and 1:01:17 hours in the half marathon, achieved in November 2017 in Boulogne-Billancourt.

References

1996 births
Living people
Eritrean male long-distance runners
Eritrean male cross country runners
Athletes (track and field) at the 2015 African Games
African Games competitors for Eritrea
21st-century Eritrean people